KRKC-FM (102.1 MHz, "Pop 102.1") is a commercial FM radio station licensed to King City, California, and serving the Central California Coast.  It is owned by Dimes Media Corporation and broadcasts a Hot Adult Contemporary radio format.  The studios and offices are on San Antonio Drive in King City.  Pop1021 carries the syndicated Kidd Kraddick Morning Show from Dallas.  The rest of the day, it plays a mix current and recent hits, plus songs from the past 25 years.

KRKC-FM has an effective radiated power (ERP) of 2,850 watts.  The transmitter is on Williams Hill, off Lockwood San Ardo Road in Lockwood.

History
On , KRKC-FM signed on the air.  It is the FM counterpart to KRKC 1490 AM, which signed on in 1958.  The two stations were owned by King City Communications Corporation until 2021. Dimes Media took ownership of the stations on July 28, 2021.  KRKC-FM is a Class B station as authorized by the Federal Communications Commission (FCC).  

The afternoon drive time DJ on Pop1021 is Michael Davis, who has handled that shift for more than three decades.  Davis was a former Music Director and on air personality at active rock station KNAC Los Angeles and was also Music Director/DJ at KFMG Albuquerque (now KBQI).  Long time General Manager William Gittler semi-retired in 2012. Gittler served as GM for 30 years and is still involved with the stations.  21 year station vet Jim Barker retired in February 2016. 

Pop1021 news updates are handled by News Director Darren Nutt. Former KSBW-TV Monterey weather personality Jim Vanderzwaan provides forecast updates. Friday nights at 5PM during football season features NFL predictions with Michael Davis.  For 15 seasons, the co-host was Lola Berlin.  But in February 2021, Berlin died just a week after the final show for the 2021 playoffs. The show has continued with other guests including personalities Laura Gomez and Daniela "DJD" Martinez. Pop1021 carries Las Vegas Raiders games via Compass Media Networks.

References

External links
KC 102 website

RKC-FM
Radio stations established in 1989
1989 establishments in California